IMG Academy is a preparatory boarding school and sports training destination in Bradenton, Florida, United States. IMG Academy is set across over 600 acres and features programs consisting of sport camps for youth athletes, adult camps, a boarding school, including a post-graduate/gap-year program, events, professional and collegiate training, group hosting, and corporate retreats. IMG Academy is owned by Worcester Academy.

History

Nick Bollettieri founded the Nick Bollettieri Tennis Academy in 1978. Sports  company IMG purchased the academy in 1987. IMG acquired the youth division of the David Leadbetter Golf Academy in 1993 and added programs for soccer and baseball in 1994. IMG Academy suspended its hockey program in 2003. Football was added in 2010, as well as lacrosse. Track & field and cross country were added in 2013.

In 2014, IMG purchased an additional . The land borders IMG's west campus, where the sports performance academy is undergoing a $198 million expansion.

The IMG Pendleton School was founded in 1999 as a co-educational, college preparatory school for athletic students. In 2012, the school changed its name to "IMG Academy". It delivers both academics and athletics.

In 2021, the school faced off against Bishop Sycamore in which they won in a 58–0 rout. Bishop Sycamore received scrutiny after the game and its existence was questioned.

Programs

Boys' and girls' tennis programs

IMG Academy tennis programs offer year-round tennis camps ranging from one to five weeks in length and are led by director Rohan Goetzke. The campus has 35 outdoor hard courts, 5 indoor hard courts, and 16 green clay courts.

In 1987, thirty-two academy students or former students were in the Wimbledon draw and twenty-seven were in the U.S. Open. Famous past students include Andre Agassi, Monica Seles, Jim Courier, Kei Nishikori, Anna Kournikova, Serena Williams, and Maria Sharapova.

Football program
IMG announced the John Madden Football Academy in March 2010 and held its first camp from June 4–6, 2010. The football program offers a residency program and year-round camps ranging from three days to five weeks in length and was previously led by former NFL quarterback Chris Weinke.  The academy fielded a high school football team for the first time in 2013. In 2013, MaxPreps called IMG Academy the "nation's top high school football facility." Kevin Wright was named head coach in 2015 after Weinke accepted a position as quarterbacks coach with the then-St. Louis Rams. Wright guided the program to its first undefeated regular season (9–0) in 2015.

Boys' and girls' soccer programs
IMG Academy offered an academy soccer program and year-round soccer camps from 1999 to 2017. IMG Academy was home to U.S. Soccer's full-time residency program for the United States' U-16 and U-17 men's national teams. It was integral in developing the United States' top youth soccer prospects. The original idea of the residency program was to give elite players the opportunity to train in a professional environment as most MLS clubs did not have a substantial youth academy system in place prior to 2009.  The Bradenton Academy grew from an initial twenty players to thirty in 2002 and then to forty in 2003.  The program was split into a U-16 squad and a U-17 squad. The girls program was a member of the Girls Academy League.

A typical day for the student-athlete at Bradenton consisted of academic classes in the morning followed by sports training in the afternoon.  Students at the academy took accelerated courses and graduate high school a year early, making the players who do not turn pro immediately some of the most heavily recruited prospects in college soccer. The academy traced its roots back to Project 2010 which highlighted ways U.S. Soccer could make the senior men's national team a legitimate threat to win the World Cup by the end of the decade.  Two programs that were born from Project 2010 were Generation Adidas (previously called Project-40) and the Bradenton Academy.  The academy was started in January 1999 with the backing of IMG and Nike, but was closed in 2017 due to the proliferation of U.S. Development Academy programs.

Baseball program
IMG Academy has an academy baseball program and year-round camps, in addition to summer Wood Bat Leagues.

IMG Basketball
IMG Academy's postgraduate program played in their only appearance in the 2016 National Prep Championship in New Haven, Connecticut. Among the teams were Brewster Academy, DME Academy, Elev-8 Sports Institute, Fork Union Military Academy, Hargrave Military Academy, IMG Academy, Northfield Mount Hermon School, and more. The head coach of IMG's national high school team is Sean McAloon, who previously was the head coach at St. John's College High School in Washington, D.C.

Its basketball alumni include Dallas Mavericks forward Dwight Powell and Orlando Magic forward Jonathan Isaac, the 6th overall pick of the 2017 NBA draft. In 2017, IMG Academy had its first two selections to the McDonald's All American Game: Trevon Duval was selected to the boys game and Rellah Boothe was selected to the girls game. In 2018, Anfernee Simons entered directly from the academy to the 2018 NBA Draft, becoming the second player in the academy's history to do so and the first American to enter and be selected in an NBA draft directly after graduating from high school since the league first implemented age restriction rules in 2005

During the preparation for the 2017 NBA Draft, the IMG Academy hosted their first ever draft combine. The Professional Basketball Combine was held as an alternative (mainly for seniors) to measure their abilities and potentially give them the chance to enter the NBA, if not allow them the chance to play in the NBA G League or even overseas, with nearly every participant that year doing exactly that. Currently, four players that participated in the event signed two-way contracts to enter the NBA properly, with eight of them going overseas and 11 players entered the G League. The event would be held once again in 2018, gaining more popularity that year with the participation of former UCLA player and current professional player LiAngelo Ball.

Due to the COVID-19 pandemic, the entire WNBA 2020 season was held there. Under a plan approved on June 15, the shortened 22-game regular season would be held without fans present.

Boys' and girls' lacrosse programs
IMG Academy has an academy lacrosse program and year-round camps. IMG Academy launched a high school team in 2012, featuring a new women's program made in 2018. Notable alumni include Tehoka Nanticoke. Prior to that, IMG Academy hosted their first full-time lacrosse student-athlete, Matthew Xirinachs, starting in September 2010. Xirinachs went on to join the Drexel men's lacrosse team in fall 2011.
The women's team hired head coach Jeff McGuigan in July 2019.

Track and field and cross country program
IMG Academy has an academy track and field and cross country program and year-round camps.

Notable alumni

Since opening in 1978, IMG Academy has trained hundreds of Olympic and professional athletes, including those in the NBA, NFL, MLB, MLS, ATP, WTA, PGA Tour and LPGA Tour.

References

External links

 
Children's sport
Sports in Florida
Sports academies
Summer camps in Florida
Education in Florida
1978 establishments in Florida
Educational institutions established in 1978
Premier Lacrosse League partnerships
Bradenton, Florida